"Taken for Granted" is the debut single of Australian singer Sia. It was the first single released from Sia's second studio album, Healing Is Difficult (2001), and was written by Sia and produced by Nigel Corsbie. It heavily samples from Sergei Prokofiev's Montagues and Capulets. "Taken for Granted" was released in 2000 and, in May of that year, debuted at number 10 on the UK Singles Chart. It stayed on the chart for a total of five weeks and topped the UK R&B Chart on the week of its debut. In Australia, the song was not released until 18 February 2002, peaking at number 100 on the ARIA Singles Chart that March.

Release
"Taken for Granted" was released as a CD single in the US on 19 May 2000. It was also made available as a vinyl single. In the UK, "Taken for Granted" was distributed as two CD singles and a cassette single on 22 May 2000. A CD single was not released in Sia's native Australia until 18 February 2002.

Chart performance
In May 2000, "Taken for Granted" debuted at its peak position of number 10 in the United Kingdom, topping the UK R&B Chart in the process. In March 2002, it had some success in Australia, peaking at number 100 on the ARIA Singles Chart.

Track listings

UK CD1
 "Taken for Granted" (radio edit)
 "Taken for Granted" (Desert Eagle Discs mix)
 "Taken for Granted" (M.V.P. mix)
 "Taken for Granted" (Groove Chronicles mix)

UK CD2
 "Taken for Granted" (radio edit)
 "Waiting for You" (Restless Soul mix)
 "Waiting for You" (Soul Brother mix)

UK 12-inch single
A. "Taken for Granted" (Groove Chronicles vocal)
B. "Taken for Granted" (Groove Chronicles instrumental)

UK cassette single
 "Taken for Granted"
 "Waiting for You"

Australian CD single
 "Taken for Granted" (radio edit)
 "Waiting for You" (Restless Soul mix)
 "Waiting for You" (Soul Brother mix)
 "Taken for Granted" (Desert Eagle Discs mix)

Charts

References

2000 debut singles
2000 songs
Sia (musician) songs
Songs written by Sia (musician)
Trip hop songs